Kim Chung-seon (1571–1642), birth name  and often known by his pen name Mohadang, was a Japanese general who defected to Korea during the Japanese invasion.

After his defection, Kim served in the Joseon army, contributing to Korean victories over Japanese forces in the battles of Dongnae and Ulsan.  Thereafter he was granted his Korean name, on the recommendations of Gwon Yul and others, and was made part of the Gimhae Kim lineage.

Kim continued his military service after the end of the Japanese invasions in 1598, working for 10 years on securing the northern border. He fought the rebellion of Yi Gwal in 1624, personally capturing Yi's lieutenant Seo A-ji (서아지 / 徐牙之).  In 1636, he participated in the defense against the Second Manchu invasion of Korea, credited with the death of some 500 Qing troops at the battle of Ssangnyeong.

After Joseon's surrender to the Manchus, Kim retired from military life, moving to Daegu where he married the daughter of the mok (목; 牧) administrative district commander Jang Chun-jeom (장춘점 / 張春點).  They settled in present-day Urok-ri, Gachang-myeon, Dalseong-gun.  Kim devoted himself to Confucian ethics, promulgating gahun (family principles) and hyangyak (village creed).

The Nokdong Seowon in Urok-ri was erected in his memory in 1789.  This seowon was abolished in 1864 as part of the regent Daewon-gun's general campaign against seowon, but was reestablished in 1914 under the Japanese colonial regime.  The seowon remains a popular destination for Japanese tourists in Daegu.

During the Japanese colonial era in the 20th century, Japanese officials and scholars tried to deny Kim’s existence. Some scholars visited the village and personally investigated the records handed down in his family. However, they did not recognize him as Japanese. Rather, they considered him “half Korean and half Japanese” or just a fictional figure. In 1930, Hidetaka Nakamura of the Japanese colonial government’s Korean History Compilation Committee conducted an investigation and confirmed that Kim Chung-seon was indeed a Japanese defector. Recently, a monument in memory of Kim was built in Wakayama Prefecture, Japan.

Kim Chung-seon is the founder of one of the Korean clan, Urok Kim clan. Kim's 6th-generation descendants compiled his collected works, which exist in two editions.

Popular culture 
 Portrayed by Hiromitsu Takeda in the 2017 tvN TV series Live Up to Your Name, Dr. Heo.

See also 
Japanese invasions of Korea (1592–1598)
List of Joseon Dynasty people

Notes

References and further reading 

Japanese defectors
People of the Japanese invasions of Korea (1592–1598)
Korean people of Japanese descent
People from Daegu
1571 births
1642 deaths
16th-century Korean people
17th-century Korean people
Urok Kim clan